Millbourne station is a rapid transit station on SEPTA's Market-Frankford Line, located adjacent east of an intersection between Millbourne Avenue and Wister Drive in Millbourne, Pennsylvania. It is one of two ground-level stops on the Market–Frankford Line, as well as one of two SEPTA rapid transit stations located outside the Philadelphia city limits. The station lies two blocks north of the line's namesake street.

History

The station was closed on April 23, 2007 for rehabilitation as part of a multi-phase reconstruction of the entire western Market Street Elevated. The renovated station included new elevators, lighting, and other infrastructure, as well as a new brick station house. Narrow wooden platforms were replaced by concrete platforms complete with ADA-accessible tactile warning strips. The station reopened on June 16, 2008.

During the Market–Frankford's rush-hour skip-stop service pattern, Millbourne was served by "B" trains, with "A" trains bypassing the station. Following a successful pilot program where all trains made all stops, the skip-stop practice was discontinued on February 24, 2020.

Station layout
The station has two side platforms connected via an elevated walkway over the tracks to the station house at Wister Drive and Sellers Avenue. There is an additional exit-only gate at the east end of the eastbound platform which leads to a staircase to North Millbourne Avenue, a dead-end residential street one block to the east.

References

External links
 

 Wister Drive and Sellers Avenue entrance from Google Maps Street View
 Images at NYCSubway.org

SEPTA Market-Frankford Line stations
Railway stations in Delaware County, Pennsylvania
Railway stations in the United States opened in 1907
1907 establishments in Pennsylvania